Farikah (also spelled Frikka, Freike, Freikeh or Furaykah) is a village in northern Syria, administratively part of the Hama Governorate, located north of Hama. It is situated in the Ghab plain. Nearby localities include Shathah and Nabl al-Khatib to the south, al-Amqiyah Tahta and al-Ankawi to the east, al-Ziyarah to the northeast and Sirmaniyah to the north. According to the Syria Central Bureau of Statistics (CBS), Farikah had a population of 2,497 in the 2004 census. Its inhabitants are predominantly Alawites.

Government forces and rebels contested Farikah throughout July 2015.

References

Alawite communities in Syria
Populated places in al-Suqaylabiyah District